Maurice Marsac (23 March 1915 – 6 May 2007) was a French actor who had a long career, with over 150 appearances in American films and television. He was also a nationally ranked croquet player.

Born in La Croix-Valmer, France, he was a member of the French Resistance in World War II.

He made his (uncredited) film debut in Paris After Dark (1943); his last part was as a maitre d' in Dragnet (1987). He was noted for portraying waiters and maitre d's. In addition to Dragnet, he played one in the films The Razor's Edge (1946, uncredited), Herbie Rides Again (1974) and The Jerk (1979), as well as episodes of I Love Lucy ("Ricky Asks for a Raise", 1952; "Paris at Last", 1956), Hazel (1966),  Columbo ("Publish or Perish", 1975), Wonder Woman ("Death in Disguise", 1978), Soap (1979) and L.A. Law ("The Douglas Fur Ball", 1987), among others. He also played Nicodemus in the 1961 biblical epic King of Kings.

He was a member of the Beverly Croquet Club and a resident pro in Newport Beach. In 1986, he was among the top 25 American players in the "informal rankings". He played in the 1994 US Croquet Open, a qualifier for the 1995 World Championships. Melanie, his wife of 55 years, was also a skilled croquet player.

Marsac died of cardiac arrest at the age of 92, less than three weeks after the passing of his wife.

Partial filmography

 Paris After Dark (1943) (uncredited)
 To Have and Have Not (1944) (uncredited)
 This Is the Life (1944)
 The Razor's Edge (1946) (uncredited)
 The Crime Doctor's Gamble (1947)
 The Woman from Tangier (1948)
 Tyrant of the Sea (1950)
 The Happy Time (1952)
 Against All Flags (1952)
 The Caddy (1953)
 How to Marry a Millionaire (1953) (uncredited)
 The Black Shield of Falworth (1954)
 Jump into Hell (1955)
 Ride the High Iron (1956)
 China Gate (1957)
 Lafayette Escadrille (1958)
 Twilight for the Gods (1958)
 The Black Chapel (1959)
 Scent of Mystery (1960)
 Armored Command (1961)
 King of Kings (1961)
 Werewolf in a Girls' Dormitory (1961)
 Come Fly with Me (1963)
 Captain Sindbad (1963)
 Take Her, She's Mine (1963)
 What a Way to Go! (1964)
 The Pleasure Seekers (1964)
 Clarence, the Cross-Eyed Lion (1965)
 Gambit (1966)
 Monkeys, Go Home! (1967)
 Double Trouble (1967)
 Caprice (1967)
 The Poseidon Adventure (1972) (uncredited)
 Herbie Rides Again (1974)
 The Jerk (1979)
 The Big Red One (1980)
 Hart to Hart (1982)
 Deal of the Century (1983)
 Dragnet (1987)

References

External links 

 

1915 births
2007 deaths
20th-century French male actors
French croquet players
French Resistance members